Bombarda is a surname. Notable people with the surname include:

Gio Paolo Bombarda (c. 1650 – 1712), Belgian classical musician
Mariano Bombarda (born 1972), Argentine footballer
Miguel Bombarda (1851–1910), Portuguese physician, psychiatrist and politician
Wilson Bombarda (born 1930), Brazilian basketball player